Neurophyseta pomperialis is a moth in the family Crambidae. It was described by Herbert Druce in 1896. It is found in Costa Rica and Mexico.

References

Moths described in 1896
Musotiminae